István Berki (born 1 February 1994) is a Hungarian professional footballer who plays for Gyirmót.

Career
On 25 August 2022, Berki joined Gyirmót on a two-year contract, with an option for a third year.

Club statistics

Updated to games played as of 19 May 2019.

References

External links
MLSZ 
HLSZ 

1994 births
People from Vác
Sportspeople from Pest County
Living people
Hungarian footballers
Hungary youth international footballers
Association football midfielders
Vác FC players
Puskás Akadémia FC players
BFC Siófok players
Salgótarjáni BTC footballers
Rákosmenti KSK players
Monori SE players
Balmazújvárosi FC players
Kazincbarcikai SC footballers
Győri ETO FC players
Gyirmót FC Győr players
Nemzeti Bajnokság I players
Nemzeti Bajnokság II players